Queralt Castellet Ibáñez (born 17 June 1989) is a Spanish snowboarder. She won a silver medal in the women's halfpipe at the 2022 Winter Olympics in Beijing. No Spanish woman had won an Olympic medal at a Winter Olympics for 30 years. She was a silver medalist at the 2015 World Championships.

Life
Castellet was born in Sabadell in 1989. As a teenager she competed at the 2006 Winter Olympics, and finished tenth in halfpipe at the 2007 World Snowboard Championships. During the 2007-08 Snowboarding World Cup circuit she placed on the podium three times, and overall she placed third in the halfpipe section of the 2007–08 World Cup.

At the 2010 Winter Olympics she scored a 44.3 on her first qualifying run, third highest. However, she suffered a concussion while practicing in the lead-up to the final and was subsequently forced to withdraw.

At the World Cup, she has seven victories, and ten additional podiums in halfpipe, and another podium in big air.

She won Spain's first silver  Olympic medal at a Winter Olympics for 30 years in the women's halfpipe at the 2022 Winter Olympics in Beijing. Chloe Kim took the gold medal and Sena Tomita was third. This was Castellet's fifth Olympics.

Personal
Castellet currently lives in New Zealand.

Olympic results

World championships results

World Cup podiums

References

External links

1989 births
Living people
Spanish female snowboarders
Snowboarders at the 2006 Winter Olympics
Snowboarders at the 2010 Winter Olympics
Snowboarders at the 2014 Winter Olympics
Snowboarders at the 2018 Winter Olympics
Snowboarders at the 2022 Winter Olympics
Medalists at the 2022 Winter Olympics
Olympic medalists in snowboarding
Olympic silver medalists for Spain
Olympic snowboarders of Spain
Sportspeople from Sabadell
Competitors at the 2015 Winter Universiade
Universiade medalists in snowboarding
Universiade silver medalists for Spain
X Games athletes